Anthony (Morgan) Rodman is the executive director of the White House Council on Native American Affairs in the Biden administration, a position he previously held in the Obama administration.

References

Biden administration personnel
Year of birth missing (living people)
Living people